Chongqing Jiaotong University was founded in 1951 as a university with engineering being the primary focus. The university also teaches management, natural sciences, and humanities. In the Nanan District of the Chongqing Municipality, China, the university has a campus occupying an area of over 1,600 mu with a floor space of 600,000 square meters.

Programs
Chongqing Jiaotong University is authorized to confer three Ph.D. degree programs, 27 master's degree programs and 42 bachelor degree majors. It is qualified to confer master's degrees to personnel of the same academic background and authority to confer engineering master's degrees in five fields.

The total enrollment of full-time students is over 16,000.

Staff
The university has a staff of 1,700 including 1,000 academic faculty members among whom there are five State-level candidates of the State “hundreds and thousands talents project”, altogether over 390 professors and associate professors. Three academics of the China Academy of Engineering — Zheng Jielian, Han Qiwei and Liang Yincheng — are specially engaged professors of the university.

In addition, the university has 120 talents including top-level candidates of the “thousands and hundreds talents project” of the Ministry of Communications (MOC), scientific and technical talents of the MOC, top-class academic and technological leaders of the Chongqing Municipality and provincial-ministerial-level specialists and experts, all entitled to governmental special allowances of the State Council.

The university has engaged over 140 part-time professors including academics of the China Academy, the China Academy of Engineering, foreign academics, experts and scholars both home and abroad.

Teaching
In 2001, the university underwent a teaching level evaluation of normal college undergraduates given by the Ministry of Education and the evaluation result was “Fine”. The graduate supply of the university falls short of demands and initial employment rate of normal college graduates has exceeded 90% for eight consecutive years. Over 50 years of operation, the university has cultivated over 40,000 graduates for the State including Zhemg Jielian, academic of the China Academy of Engineering, and Liu Xiaofeng, vice governor of Sichuan Province.

Research
In the last five years the university has undertaken 40 scientific research programs of State grade, 250 scientific and research programs of provincial and ministerial grades and has published 100 academic works and 4,000 academic papers.

The university has obtained 20 patents for inventions.

It has issued three public academic journals among which Applied Mathematics and Mechanism (whose chief editor Qian Weichang is an academic of the China Academy of Science) is mainly operated by the university and included in SCI and EI. The journal is published in Chinese and English versions to more than 50 states and districts all over the world. The Journal of Chongqing Jiaotong University (natural science edition) is a scientific and technological journal associated with the university.

Library
The university library has 1.4 million books and a broadband Internet network that covers the entire campus.

Awards
Since 2000, after receiving State invention award in 1996 and the second and the third prizes of the State scientific and technological progress in 1998, the university has received another three State prizes: the State first prize and the second prize for scientific and technological progress, the State second prize for teaching fruit.

International collaboration
Chongqing Jiaotong University has cooperative relationships with 30 foreign universities and scientific research units including the University of Texas in United States, University of Hannover in Germany, University of St. Petersburg in Russia, University of Burgos in Spain and University of Hanoi in Vietnam. Since 2004, the university has started to enroll overseas students.

References

External links
 Official website 

1951 establishments in China
Educational institutions established in 1951
Universities and colleges in Chongqing
Nan'an District
Jiaotong University